Slavomír Pagáč (born 7 January 1997) is a Slovak footballer who plays as a centre back for FK Dubnica on loan from KFC Komárno.

Career

FC DAC 1904 Dunajská Streda
Pagáč made his professional debut for FC DAC 1904 Dunajská Streda against MFK Ružomberok on 27 May 2017.

References

External links
 FC DAC 1904 Dunajská Streda official club profile
  
 Futbalnet Profile

1997 births
Living people
Slovak footballers
Association football defenders
FK Dubnica players
FC DAC 1904 Dunajská Streda players
KFC Komárno players
Slovak Super Liga players
2. Liga (Slovakia) players
People from Ilava
Sportspeople from the Trenčín Region